No One Home is an album by Argentine composer, pianist and conductor Lalo Schifrin recorded in 1979 and released on the Tabu label.

Track listing
 "No One Home" (Lalo Schifrin, Gale Garnett) - 6:45  
 "Oh Darlin'... Life Goes On" (Minnie Riperton, Richard Rudolph, Freddie Perren) - 4:32
 "Enchanted Flame" (Lalo Schifrin, Cheyenne Fowler, Donna Schifrin) - 5:16  
 "You Feel Good" (Lalo Schifrin, Gale Garnett) - 7:11  
 "Memory of Love" (Lalo Schifrin, Maya Angelou) - 4:39  
 "Middle of the Night" (Monique Adelbert, Louis Adelbert) - 4:00

Personnel
Lalo Schifrin - keyboards, arranger, conductor
Chuck Findley, Jerry Hey - trumpet, flugelhorn
Alan Kaplan, William Reichenbach - trombone
Ernie Watts, Kim Richmond - woodwinds
Michael Boddicker, Patrice Rushen, Ian Underwood - keyboards
Paul Jackson, Jr., Tim May - guitar
Byron Miller, Ed Watkins -  bass
Alex Acuña, Leon "Ndugu" Chancler - drums
Paulinho da Costa - percussion
Wah Wah Watson - voice bag & Guitar
Sylvia Smith, Lynn Davis, Virginia Ayers, Sandy Graham, Ron Hicklin, Eddie Lehann, John Bahler, Debbie Hall - vocals
Harry Bluestone, Henry Ferber, Mari Botnick, Arnold Belnick, William Kurasch, Ronald Fulsom, John Wittenberg, Endre Granat, Assa Drori, Nathan Ross, Stanley Plummer - violin
Janet Lakatos, David Schwartz, Gareth Nuttycombe, Allan Harshman - viola
Douglas Davis, Raphael Kramer, Raymond Kelley, Dennis Karmazyn - cello

References

Tabu Records albums
Lalo Schifrin albums
1979 albums
Albums arranged by Lalo Schifrin
Albums conducted by Lalo Schifrin